Dávid Krčík (born 28 June 1999) is a Slovak footballer who plays for MFK Karviná as a defender.

Club career

MFK Tatran Liptovský Mikuláš
Dávid Krčík made his Fortuna Liga debut for Tatran Liptovský Mikuláš against Slovan Bratislava on 24 July 2021.

References

External links
 MFK Tatran Liptovský Mikuláš official club profile 
 
 
 Futbalnet profile 

1999 births
Living people
People from Prievidza
Sportspeople from the Trenčín Region
Slovak footballers
Slovak expatriate footballers
Association football defenders
FC Baník Prievidza players
MFK Tatran Liptovský Mikuláš players
FC Vysočina Jihlava players
MFK Karviná players
3. Liga (Slovakia) players
4. Liga (Slovakia) players
2. Liga (Slovakia) players
Slovak Super Liga players
Czech National Football League players
Expatriate footballers in the Czech Republic
Slovak expatriate sportspeople in the Czech Republic